The crackpot index is a number that rates scientific claims or the individuals that make them, in conjunction with a method for computing that number. While the indices have been created for their humorous value, their general concepts can be applied in other fields like risk management.

Baez's crackpot index 
The method, proposed semi-seriously by mathematical physicist John C. Baez in 1992, computes an index by responses to a list of 36 questions, each positive response contributing a point value ranging from 1 to 50.  The computation is initialized with a value of −5. An earlier version only had 17 questions with point values for each ranging from 1 to 40.

Presumably any positive value of the index indicates crankiness.

Though the index was not proposed as a serious method, it nevertheless has become popular in Internet discussions of whether a claim or an individual is cranky, particularly in physics (e.g., at the Usenet newsgroup sci.physics), or in mathematics.

Chris Caldwell's Prime Pages has a version adapted to prime number research which is a field with many famous unsolved problems that are easy to understand for amateur mathematicians.

Gruenberger's measure for crackpots 
An earlier crackpot index is Fred J. Gruenberger's "A Measure for Crackpots" published in December 1962 by the RAND Corporation.

See also

 Crank (person)
 List of topics characterized as pseudoscience
 Pseudophysics

References

External links
 The Crackpot Index. by John Baez. 
  The CRACKPOT Index: A simple method for rating potentially revolutionary contributions to physics

Humour
Usenet
Pseudoscience